Vikas Grover is an Indian actor who is known for his roles in the Sab TV show Aladdin – Naam toh Suna Hoga as the role of Gulbadan. and Devrishi Narada in Sankat Mochan Mahabali Hanumaan.

He has also started in many other television series namely Beintehaa, Jeet Gayi Toh Piya Morey, Yam Hain Hum, Tu Sooraj Main Saanjh, Piyaji and Maaya 2. He is currently playing the role of Harry Khatri in Wagle Ki Duniya-Nayi Peedhi Naye Kissey.

Filmography

Televisions

References 

Indian male television actors
Living people
1989 births